Sarbisheh County is in South Khorasan province, Iran. The capital of the county is the city of Sarbisheh. At the 2006 census, the county's population was 37,591 in 10,119 households. The following census in 2011 counted 39,487 people in 11,164 households. At the 2016 census, the county's population was 40,959 in 12,011 households. Sarbisheh is Persian for "forest gate," and contains the last remaining dry forests of southern Khorasan in its surrounding mountains.

Administrative divisions

The population history and structural changes of Sarbisheh County's administrative divisions over three consecutive censuses are shown in the following table. The latest census shows three districts, six rural districts, and two cities.

References

 

Counties of South Khorasan Province